Sunan Bonang (born Raden Makdum Ibrahim in Tuban, East Java, in 1465 CE; died in 1525 CE at Pulau Bawean) was one of the Wali Songo, along with his father Sunan Ampel and his brother Sunan Drajat.

Bonang is a village in Rembang Regency. Sunan Bonang is buried in Bonang Village, but the most pilgrimage grave is in Tuban City. There are two location of Sunan Bonang graves. Because many people say, when he died, the news of his death heard by his student from Madura. The student who admired him want to carry his body to Madura. But he can't, then he just brought his shrouds and clothes. When he pass Tuban, he met another Sunan Bonang's student from Tuban who heard that there are Sunan Bonang's student from Madura carried Sunan Bonang's body to Madura. Then they scrambled each other.

He was a descendant of Majapahit nobility in Tuban and a Chinese captain named Gan Eng Cu. After becoming a prominent ulama, he tried to make ordinary Javanese familiar with Islam. He achieved it through art.

He changed traditional Javanese songs, which had been heavily influenced by Hindu philosophy, and incorporated Islamic thought. He also employed gamelan as medium of Islamic learning. One of his teachings is Tombo Ati, which literally mean "Cures of the Heart".

See also

 Islam in Indonesia
 The spread of Islam in Indonesia (1200 to 1600)
 Ali al-Uraidhi ibn Ja'far al-Sadiq

Notes

External links
 

1465 births
1525 deaths
Wali Sanga
Indonesian people of Chinese descent
Indonesian people of Arab descent